The Central South Regional Football Association Division One League, also known as the CSRFA Division One, is one of the regional leagues that make up the third tier of Botswana football. It is administered by the Central South Regional Football Association and features teams from in and around Mahalapye.

Clubs
List of clubs in the 2019-20 CSRFA Division One:
Queens Park Rangers (Mahalapye)
Covenant (Mahalapye)
Kalamare United (Kalamare)
K12 Real (Kalamare)
Tshikinyega Tigers (Mahalapye)
Mafia Stars (Mahalapye)
Desmo Royals (Mahalapye)
Shoshong United (Shoshong)
Boston FC (Mahalapye)
Mahalapye United Hotspurs (Mahalapye)
Rolling Guys (Mahalapye)
Masterpiece (Mahalapye)
Sports Varsity (Mahalapye)
Man Machine (Kalamare)
Matsubutsubu (Shoshong)

Past seasons

Manager records

References

Football leagues in Botswana